The 2015–16 Bradley Braves men's basketball team represented Bradley University during the 2015–16 NCAA Division I men's basketball season. The Braves were led by first year head coach Brian Wardle, who was hired in the offseason to replace Geno Ford. The Braves were members of the Missouri Valley Conference and played their home games at Carver Arena in Peoria, Illinois. They finished the season 5–27, 3–15 in Missouri Valley play to finish in ninth place. They lost in the first round of the Missouri Valley tournament to Loyola–Chicago.

Previous season
The Braves finished the 2014–15 season with an overall record of 9–24. The team finished in last place in the Missouri Valley Conference with a conference record of 3–15. Following a first round upset of No. 7 seed Drake in the MVC tournament, the Braves season ended with a loss to Northern Iowa.

On March 22, 2015, Bradley fired head men's basketball coach Geno Ford, who compiled a 46–86 (19–53) record in four seasons at Bradley. Ford was replaced less than a week later by UW–Green Bay head coach Brian Wardle.

Departures

Incoming Transfers

2015 recruiting class

Roster

Schedule and results

|-
! colspan="9" style=|  Exhibition

|-
! colspan="9" style=|  Non-conference regular season

|-
! colspan="12" style=| Missouri Valley Conference regular season

|-
! colspan="9" style=|  Missouri Valley tournament

References

Bradley Braves men's basketball seasons
Bradley
Bradley Braves men's basketball
Bradley Braves men's basketball